Raúl García Castán (born 8 October 1970) is a Spanish male sky runner, European champion (2009) and vice-European champion (2008) in the SkyRace, second in the 2007 World Cup.

References

External links
Raúl García Castán profile at Trangoworld

1970 births
Living people
Spanish sky runners